Jolley is a city in Calhoun County, Iowa, United States. The population was 28 at the time of the 2020 census.

History
Jolley was platted in 1883. The town was incorporated in 1895.

Geography
Jolley is located at  (42.479239, -94.718127).

Jolley lies at the southwestern margin (rim) of Manson crater, an impact structure buried by glacial till and outwash.

Demographics

2010 census
As of the census of 2010, there were 41 people, 21 households, and 12 families living in the city. The racial makeup of the city was 100.0% White. Hispanic or Latino of any race were 4.9% of the population.

There were 21 households, of which 19.0% had children under the age of 18 living with them, 42.9% were married couples living together, 4.8% had a female householder with no husband present, 9.5% had a male householder with no wife present, and 42.9% were non-families. 42.9% of all households were made up of individuals, and 9.6% had someone living alone who was 65 years of age or older. The average household size was 1.95 and the average family size was 2.58.

The median age in the city was 49.6 years. 14.6% of residents were under the age of 18; 7.3% were between the ages of 18 and 24; 14.6% were from 25 to 44; 51.2% were from 45 to 64; and 12.2% were 65 years of age or older. The gender makeup of the city was 61.0% male and 39.0% female.

2000 census
As of the census of 2000, there were 54 people, 28 households, and 12 families living in the city. The racial makeup of the city was 100.00% White. Hispanic or Latino of any race were 1.85% of the population.

There were 28 households, out of which 21.4% had children under the age of 18 living with them, 35.7% were married couples living together, 10.7% had a female householder with no husband present, and 53.6% were non-families. 50.0% of all households were made up of individuals, and 25.0% had someone living alone who was 65 years of age or older. The average household size was 1.93 and the average family size was 2.92.

In the city, the population was spread out, with 22.2% under the age of 18, 11.1% from 18 to 24, 20.4% from 25 to 44, 27.8% from 45 to 64, and 18.5% who were 65 years of age or older. The median age was 42 years. For every 100 females, there were 134.8 males. For every 100 females age 18 and over, there were 121.1 males.

The median income for a household in the city was $24,286, and the median income for a family was $48,125. Males had a median income of $30,625 versus $26,250 for females. The per capita income for the city was $23,268. There were 18.2% of families and 12.3% of the population living below the poverty line, including no under eighteens and 33.3% of those over 64.

Education
It is within the South Central Calhoun Community School District.

Jolley was previously in the Rockwell City–Lytton Community School District, formed on July 1, 1993. That district merged into South Central Calhoun on July 1, 2014.

References

Cities in Calhoun County, Iowa
Cities in Iowa